Manfred Kaiser (7 January 1929 – 15 February 2017) was a German footballer.

References

External links

Career stats
International career

1929 births
2017 deaths
People from Zeitz
People from the Province of Saxony
German footballers
East German footballers
Footballers from Saxony-Anhalt
East German football managers
German football managers
East Germany international footballers
Association football midfielders
DDR-Oberliga players
FC Erzgebirge Aue players